Philip Coolidge (August 5, 1908 – May 23, 1967) was an American stage, film, and television actor, who performed predominantly in supporting roles during a career that spanned over three decades, from 1930 to the late 1960s.

Early life
Born in Concord, Massachusetts in 1908, Philip was the youngest of eight children of Mary (née Colt) and Sidney E. Coolidge, who was the treasurer for a local textile company and later the owner of a bleachery.<ref
 name="Massbirths">"Births Registered in the Town of Concord for the Year Nineteen Hundred and Eight", Philip Coolidge, August 25, 1908; parents: Sydney E. Coolidge and Mary L. Colt, residents Concord, Massachusetts; registry, "Massachusetts Births, 1841—1915", p. 422, birth number 4611. Digital copy of original handwritten registry accessed via FamilySearch online archives, Salt Lake City, Utah, June 6, 2022.</ref> The 1910 federal census documents that the Coolidge household included two live-in maids and a full-time cook, indications that Sydney's executive positions and income provided his family with an upper-class lifestyle. That status also allowed Philip later to attend the prestigious Milton Academy, where he completed his secondary education.

Stage career
Following his graduation from Milton, Philip worked initially in radio, serving as an announcer for a station in Boston. Soon, though, he chose another career path, one as a stage actor. In 1930 he made his debut with the Peabody Repertory Company in Boston, playing four different roles in the troupe's production  of Romeo and Juliet. Coolidge over the next several years performed in assorted plays in Boston, at the Globe Theatre in Chicago, and elsewhere with traveling companies. By 1938 he began acting regularly in New York City, where that year he was cast as the church organist Simon Stimson in the original Broadway production of Thornton Wilder's play Our Town, which was presented at Henry Miller's Theatre and co-starred Frank Craven and Martha Scott. Over the next 26 years, even after he expanded his acting career into films and television, Coolidge continued to appear in a wide variety of stage productions, including many more on Broadway. He performed there in the 1940s in plays such as Suzanna and the Elders, In Time to Come, Jacobowsky and the Colonel, Barefoot Boy With Cheek, and The Traitor. Then, in the 1950s, he was cast in The Liar, Legend of Sarah, Darkness at Noon, Barefoot in Athens, The Gambler, The Crucible, as Omar Khayyam in Kismet, and in A Visit to a Small Planet. His final appearances on the "Great White Way" were in the early 1960s as Mr. Nicklebush in Rhinoceros and as the Danish ambassador Voltemand in a modern, highly stylized interpretation of Hamlet directed by John Gielgud and starring Richard Burton.

Reputation as stage actor and director
Often acknowledged in trade publications and in newspaper reviews for his effective performances in the "legitimate" theatre, Coolidge drew special attention for his work on Broadway in Darkness at Noon (1951) and in The Gambler (1952). The popular trade paper Variety in its January 17, 1951 assessment of Darkness at Noon commends the actor for his "persuasive" representation of a "sardonic political prisoner" trying to survive the brutality and paranoia of a Soviet-style revolution. The following year, in its October 15 review of The Gambler, the critic for Variety includes Coolidge among what he describes as the play's "unusually good" supporting cast, more specifically for the actor's portrayal of Commissioner Costa, "the practical but puzzled trial examiner". While Coolidge was repeatedly recognized as an accomplished theatre actor during his career, by the late 1940s he was also being contracted to direct major productions. For instance, in Washington, D.C. in 1948 he directed the comedy There Goes the Bride, which premiered May 10 that year at the National Theatre and starred Ilka Chase and Robert Alda.

Films
When considering the length of Coolidge's acting career, which lasted nearly 40 years, his filmography  appears to be rather modest in length, amounting to only 15 productions. English film historian and critic David Quinlan contends in his 1986 book The Illustrated Encyclopedia of Movie Character Actors that Coolidge was "considerably under-used by Hollywood", that the "Dark, lanky, stoop-shouldered American actor of hangdog aspect" was ultimately only a "visitor" to films when compared to his other work in stage and television productions.

By the late 1940s, Coolidge also began acting in feature films. His first film role, though uncredited on screen, is in the 1947 20th-Century Fox crime drama Boomerang starring Dana Andrews and Jane Wyatt. A few of his subsequent credited appearances include his portrayal of a self-protective small-town mayor in Inherit the Wind (1960), as Dr. Cross in North by Northwest (1959), and as Wilbur Peterson in It Happened to Jane (1959).

Television
Rarely cast as a leading character, Coolidge plays the shopkeeper Throckmorton in the 1962 episode "A Piano in the House" on the classic science fiction series The Twilight Zone. He also portrays William Windom's assistant, "Mr. Cooper", in the first season of the 1960s sitcom The Farmer's Daughter.

Personal life and death
Coolidge, who never married, died at age 58 of lung cancer at Cedars of Lebanon Hospital in Los Angeles in May 1967. In accordance with his instructions, no funeral was held and his body was cremated. The veteran actor had continued to perform until shortly before his death, managing to complete the filming of his scenes as the character "Fingers" Felton in the Walt Disney production Never a Dull Moment. That crime comedy, starring Dick Van Dyke, was not released to theaters until June 1968, more than a year after Coolidge died.

Filmography

Selected television roles

References

External links

1908 births
1967 deaths
Male actors from Massachusetts
20th-century American male actors
American male film actors
American male television actors
Deaths from lung cancer
Male Western (genre) film actors
Western (genre) television actors